Carnival Nights (Spanish: Noches de cabaret) is a 1978 Mexican comedy drama film directed by Rafael Portillo and starring Jorge Rivero, Sasha Montenegro and Carmen Salinas.

Cast
 Jorge Rivero 
 Sasha Montenegro 
 Carmen Salinas 
 Eduardo de la Peña 
 Irma Serrano 
 Lyn May
 Norma Baeza 
 Víctor Manuel Castro 
 Arturo Cobo 
 Luis de Alba 
 Belinda Falcon 
 Rafael Inclán 
 Roxy Lamarque 
 Martha Lorena 
 Olga Manzolli 
 Pancho Muller 
 Lupita Muñoz
 Polo Ortín 
 Sonia Piña 
 Maricarmen Resendez 
 America Rios 
 Rosella 
 Gabriela Ríos 
 Paco Sañudo 
 Carlos Suarez 
 Olga Swan 
 Claudia Tate 
 Rita Valencia 
 Pedro Weber 'Chatanuga' 
 Liza Willert
 Princesa Yamal 
 Alfonso Zayas

References

Bibliography 
 Charles Ramírez Berg. Cinema of Solitude: A Critical Study of Mexican Film, 1967-1983. University of Texas Press, 2010.

External links 
 

1978 films
1978 comedy-drama films
Mexican comedy-drama films
1970s Spanish-language films
Films directed by Rafael Portillo
1978 comedy films
1978 drama films
1970s Mexican films